An insurance commissioner (or commissioner of insurance) is a public official in the executive branch of a state or territory in the United States who, along with his or her office, regulate the insurance industry. The powers granted to the office of an insurance commissioner differ in each state. The office of an insurance commissioner is established either by the state constitution or by statute. While most insurance commissioners are appointed, in some jurisdictions they are elected. The office of the insurance commissioner may be part of a larger regulatory agency, or an autonomous department.

Insurance law and regulation is established individually by each state. In order to better coordinate insurance regulation among the states and territories, insurance commissioners are members of the National Association of Insurance Commissioners (NAIC).

Duties and powers of insurance commissioners  
The purpose of insurance commissioners is to maintain fair pricing for insurance products, protect the solvency of insurance companies, prevent unfair practices by insurance companies, and ensure availability of insurance coverage. In order to accomplish these goals, each state grants several powers to insurance commissioners and their offices, including:
 Approval of insurance rates
 Periodical financial examinations of insurers
 Licensing of companies, agencies, agents, and brokers
 Monitoring and regulating claims handling

List of current insurance commissioners 
, the various insurance commissioners are:

References